Signal-regulatory protein beta-1 is a protein that in humans is encoded by the SIRPB1 gene. SIRPB1 has also recently been designated CD172B (cluster of differentiation 172B).

The protein encoded by this gene is a member of the signal-regulatory-protein (SIRP) family, and also belongs to the immunoglobulin superfamily. SIRP family members are receptor-type transmembrane glycoproteins known to be involved in the negative regulation of receptor tyrosine kinase-coupled signaling processes. This protein was found to interact with TYROBP/DAP12, a protein bearing immunoreceptor tyrosine-based activation motifs. This protein was also reported to participate in the recruitment of tyrosine kinase SYK. Alternatively spliced transcript variants have been found for this gene.

Interactions
SIRPB1 has been shown to interact with TYROBP.

References

Further reading

External links
 
 

Clusters of differentiation